MA Khayer is a Bangladesh Awami League politician and the former Member of Parliament of Khulna-1 And Bagerhat-1.

Career
Khayer  was elected to parliament from Khulna-1 as a Bangladesh Awami League candidate in 1973. He was elected to parliament from Bagerhat-1 as a Bangladesh Awami League candidate in 1986.

References

Awami League politicians
3rd Jatiya Sangsad members
1st Jatiya Sangsad members
Year of death missing
Year of birth missing
People from Bagerhat District